Edna Mae Harris (September 29, 1914 – September 15, 1997), sometimes credited as Edna May Harris was an American actress and singer. Harris was one of the first African–American film actress of the late 1930s and early 1940s, appearing in films featuring mostly African–American casts.

Biography

Early life and career
Born in Harlem, Harris parents were Sam, a boxer and customs inspector; Her mother Mary Harris (née Walker) worked as a maid. Harris' family is noted as one of the first families to have migrated to Harlem. Settling near the Lafayette Theater, Harris was convinced into pursuing a career in show business by Ethel Waters and Maud Russell who were frequent visitors to her family home. After being coached on her singing and dancing by Waters and Russell, Harris began performing in the Theater Owners Booking Association (TOBA). An African-American vaudeville circuit, Harris performed with TOBA from 1929 until 1933.

Harris attended Wadleigh High School (later known as Wadleigh High School for Girls) in Manhattan. During the summer after her sophomore year of high school, Harris worked at the Alhambra Theater doing dramatic sketches with a stock company. During this period, Harris received excellent training in diction and stage delivery through her association with veteran performers. Harris was also an excellent swimmer in high school, and in 1928 she entered the New York Daily News' Swimming Meet and won a championship.

Career
Harris first real Hollywood break came when she landed a part in The Green Pastures (1936), portraying Zeba, starring with Eddie 'Rochester' Anderson. Harris was a leading lady in Spirit of Youth (1938), the story of the rise of boxer Joe Thomas, which paralleled the life of Joe Louis.

Harris also had leading roles in Oscar Micheaux films, Lying Lips (1939), and The Notorious Elinor Lee (1940). Her film credits also include such Hollywood films as Bullets or Ballots (1936), Private Number (1936), and Garden of Allah (1936), and the independent film Paradise in Harlem in 1939. Between picture commitments she toured with Noble Sissle's Orchestra as a featured vocalist along with Lena Horne and Billy Banks. In 1942, she played fourteen weeks at the old Elks' Rendezvous as the mistress of ceremonies and announced a weekly radio show over station WMCA in New York City. She also did character dialect parts on many broadcasts for the Columbia Workshop Program. Edna Mae Harris got to tell her story in her later years in the documentary, Midnight Ramble (1994), about independently produced black films.

Death 
Harris died of a heart attack on September 15, 1997 at the age of 82.

Filmography

Personal life
Harris was married twice: first to Edward Randolph from 1933 until 1938, then to Harlem nightclub owner Walter Anderson from 1951 until his death in 1983. 

Harris dated boxer Joe Louis sometime during 1939 and 1940. Harris dated Robert Paquin, who co-starred with her in the Lying Lips from 1941 until 1942.

Footnotes

External links

1914 births
1997 deaths
American film actresses
African-American actresses
People from Harlem
20th-century American actresses
Actresses from New York City
20th-century African-American women
20th-century African-American people